CUBRID ( "cube-rid") is an open-source SQL-based relational database management system (RDBMS) with object extensions developed by CUBRID Corp. for OLTP. The name CUBRID is a combination of the two words cube and bridge, cube standing for a space for data and bridge standing for data bridge.

License policy

CUBRID has a separate license for its server engine and its interfaces. The server engine adopts the Apache License 2.0, which allows distribution, modification, and acquisition of the source code. CUBRID APIs and GUI tools have the Berkeley Software Distribution license in which there is no obligation of opening derivative works. The reason of adopting two separate license systems is to provide complete freedom to Independent software vendors (ISV) to develop and distribute CUBRID-based applications.

Architecture

The feature that distinguishes CUBRID database from other relational database systems is its 3-tier client-server architecture which consists of the database server, the connection broker and the application layer.

Database server
The database server is the component of the CUBRID database management system which is responsible for storage operations and statement execution. A CUBRID database server instance can mount and use a single database, making inter-database queries impossible. However, more than one instance can run on a machine.

Unlike other solutions, the database server does not compile queries itself, but executes queries precompiled in a custom access specification language.

Connection broker

The CUBRID connection broker's main roles are:
 management of client application connections
 caching and relaying information (e.g. query results)
 query syntax analysis, optimization and execution plan generation

Also, a local object pool enables some parts of the execution to be deferred from the database server (e.g. tuple insertion and deletion, DDL statements), thus lowering the database server load.

Since the connection broker is not bound to the same machine as the database server, CUBRID can take advantage of the hardware resources of several machines while processing queries on a single database.

Application layer
Applications can use one of the available APIs to connect to a CUBRID connection broker.

Features

High Availability
CUBRID High Availability provides load-balanced, fault-tolerant and continuous service availability through its shared-nothing clustering, automated fail-over and manual fail-back mechanisms.

CUBRID's 3-tier architecture allows native support for High-Availability with two-level auto failover: the broker failover and server failover.

Broker failover
When connecting to a broker via a client API, users can specify, in the connection URL, a list of alternative hosts where brokers are listening for incoming requests. In case of a hardware, network, operating system or software failure on one of the hosts, the underlying client API automatically fails over to the next host that a user has provided.

Server failover
The High Availability environment can be built with 1:N master-slave server nodes. Each slave node communicates with the master via CUBRID Heartbeat protocol. When a master node is unresponsive, the first of the slave nodes will get promoted to a master role. Replication between nodes can be achieved in one of two modes: synchronous and asynchronous.

Administrators can specify a list of server hosts each broker can connect to and, in the event of a failure of the master node, another will be used.

Scalability and Maintainability

Backup
CUBRID supports online, offline and incremental backup.

Performance

API-level load balancing
Because a connection broker can be configured in four different modes (read-write, read-only, slave-only, preferred host read only), the list of alternative hosts which a user has provided via the connection URL can be used as a method to balance the load. When Load Balancing is used, the client API will randomly choose a host among those specified in the connection URL except the one which was used to connect to last time. If the chosen host is not available, the selection will continue until all the hosts are determined as unavailable. In such case, the driver will report an error.

Query plan caching
A query execution plan cache is implemented on the broker in order to skip most of the compilation steps on often used queries. Because the queries are parametrized during parsing, two queries that differ only by the values of literal constants share the same cache entry.

Storage

Indexes
CUBRID has support for B+-tree indexes, both single-column and multi-column. The following types of indexes can be created:
 Indexes and reversed indexes
 Unique indexes and reverse unique indexes
 Function-based indexes
 Filtered indexes

The query optimizer can use indexes to produce faster execution plans using methods such as:
 Identifying covering indexes
 Descending index scans
 ORDER BY skip
 GROUP BY skip
 Multi-range limit optimizations
 Index Loose Scan
 Index Skip Scan

Table partitioning
CUBRID supports horizontal partitioning by range, hash and value lists, with a maximum of 1024 partitions per table. Partitions can be accessed independently and support most operations that are valid on a normal table.

As of version 9.0, CUBRID implements execution-time partition pruning.

SQL support
CUBRID implements a large subset of the ANSI SQL:1999 standard, extended with features from later SQL standards and custom features.

Window functions
CUBRID provides support for window functions as defined in the SQL:2003 standard. The implemented functions are ROW_NUMBER, COUNT, MIN, MAX, SUM, AVG, STDDEV_POP, STDDEV_SAMP, VAR_POP, VAR_SAMP, RANK, DENSE_RANK, LEAD, LAG and NTILE.

Hierarchical queries
Hierarchical queries using the non-standard START WITH ... CONNECT BY Oracle syntax are supported in CUBRID. A number of specialized pseudocolumns and operators are provided for controlling the behavior of the query execution.

Built in click-counter
CUBRID optimizes the common scenario in web applications where database fields need to be incremented on certain events (e.g. page views). In contrast to the usual approach of using a SELECT/UPDATE statement combination, CUBRID can increment fields from within the SELECT statement execution, bypassing some expensive compiling, execution and locking overhead associated with an UPDATE statement.

Java stored procedures
The only stored procedure language supported in CUBRID is Java, requiring a Java virtual machine to be installed on the system.
The virtual machine is started and managed by the server and is used for code execution.

Stored procedure code that requires database access must use the JDBC driver, either using the parent transaction or issuing a new one.

Regular expression
In addition to the LIKE operator, CUBRID provides the REGEXP operator for regular expression pattern matching. By default, the operator does a case insensitive matching on the input string, but the modifier BINARY can be used for case sensitive scenarios. An optional alias of REGEXP is RLIKE.

In the prior version of CUBRID 11, CUBRID does not support REGEXP on Unicode strings.

From the CUBRID 11, CUBRID adds the following regular expression functions and supports them on Unicode strings.
 REGEXP_COUNT, REGEXP_INSTR, REGEXP_LIKE, REGEXP_REPLACE, REGEXP_SUBSTR

Data types
A variety of data types are supported by CUBRID:
 For numeric values:
 integer numerics: SMALLINT (16 bit), INTEGER (32 bit), BIGINT (64 bit)
 floating point numerics: FLOAT (32 bit), DOUBLE (64 bit)
 arbitrary precision numerics: NUMERIC
 monetary values: MONETARY (double precision floating point)
 For string values:
 fixed-length character and bit strings: CHAR, BIT
 variable-length character and bit strings: CHAR VARYING, BIT VARYING
 For date and time values:
 date values: DATE
 time values: TIME
 date and time values: DATETIME, TIMESTAMP (internally stored as a Unix timestamp)
 For collections: SET, MULTISET, LIST
 User defined enumerations: ENUM
 For large objects: BLOB, CLOB
 For JavaScript Object Notation: JSON

Supported platforms
CUBRID is available for Microsoft Windows and Linux (most distributions), for 32- and 64-bit architectures.

Interfaces

Command line
CUBRID comes with a built-in command-line interface named csql that can be used to execute SQL statements on the CUBRID server.
The tool can be used in one of two modes:
 CS (client/server) mode, which can connect to local or remote CUBRID servers
 SA (stand alone) mode, used mainly for administration purposes, which mounts a local database by emulating a server instance
CUBRID's csql also implements some internal commands related to schema information, plan generation, debugging, transaction control, query timing and more.

Programming

CUBRID provides a number of language-specific application programming interfaces: C driver (also called CCI, CUBRID's native driver), JDBC, PHP/PDO driver, ODBC, OLEDB, ADO.NET, Ruby driver, Python driver, Node.js driver and Perl driver.

Graphical
Several graphical user interface tools have been developed for CUBRID:

 CUBRID Manager is a query browser and database administration tool distributed under the BSD license on macOS and Linux.
 CUBRID Admin is an administration tool distributed under the BSD license on Windows.
 SQLGate is a query browser tool developed by CHEQUER on Windows.
 CUBRID Migration Toolkit is a tool which allows data migration from Oracle, MS-SQL, MySQL and previous versions of CUBRID databases to the latest CUBRID database server.

Release history

Applications
Some applications and websites that have added CUBRID support or are powered by CUBRID:
 jOOQ
 SOFA Statistics
 SIDU
 ART
 Scriptella
 JWhoisServer
 Yii2 PHP Framework
 RedBeanPHP
DBeaver

See also

 Comparison of relational database management systems
 Comparison of object-relational database management systems
 List of relational database management systems

References

External links
 

Free database management systems
Relational database management systems
Client-server database management systems
Cross-platform software
ORDBMS software for Linux